Polina Yuryevna Vedekhina (born 6 January 1994) is a Russian handballer who plays for Astrakhanochka and the Russia national team.

International honours  
EHF Champions League:
Semifinalist: 2021
EHF Cup Winners' Cup:
Semifinalist: 2012

Individual awards 
 Best Defence Player of the European U-17 Championship: 2011

References

External links

1994 births
Living people
Sportspeople from Volgograd
Russian female handball players
Universiade medalists in handball
Universiade gold medalists for Russia
Medalists at the 2015 Summer Universiade
Handball players at the 2020 Summer Olympics
Medalists at the 2020 Summer Olympics
Olympic medalists in handball
Olympic silver medalists for the Russian Olympic Committee athletes